Erik Scott Kimerer (born July 6, 1988) is an American voice actor and professional wrestler under the name 'Sassy Assassin' in Brian Kendrick's Wrestling Pro Wrestling. As a voice actor, he has provided voices for the English dubs of Japanese anime and video games. Some of his major voice roles include Ryuji Takasu in Toradora!, Obanai Iguro in Demon Slayer: Kimetsu no Yaiba, Biscuit Griffon in Mobile Suit Gundam: Iron-Blooded Orphans, Riku Mikami in Gundam Build Divers, Alibaba Saluja in the Magi series, Hydra Knell in Blood Lad, Speed o' Sound Sonic in One-Punch Man, Teruki Hanazawa in Mob Psycho 100, Ayato Amagiri in The Asterisk War, and Haruyuki Arita in Accel World.

Filmography

Anime

Video games

Animation

Professional wrestling career

Wrestling pro wrestling (2019 – )
In 2018, Kimerer had his debut in professional wrestling as the Sassy Assassin. A sneaky thief with a lisp. As the Sassy Assassin, Kimerer debuted in Hoodslam SoCal-iente, in a losing effort against Otto Von Clutch. A year later, he would make his WPW debut in the WPW Gauntlet Battle Royal with Sneaky Pete (RJ Santos) in a losing effort. Months later. The two would be in a match winning the WPW Tag Team championships, Erik Kimerer's first and thus far only championship in professional wrestling. He and Santos however, would lose the tag team championships to the Two Man Gang, in the teams first title defense.

References

External links
 
 

American male video game actors
American male voice actors
Male actors from Washington (state)
University of Puget Sound alumni
Living people
People from Edmonds, Washington
21st-century American male actors
1988 births